There are a number of regular knife cuts that are used in many recipes, each producing a standardized cut piece of food. The two basic shapes are the strip and the cube.

Strip cuts 

It is also the starting point for the small dice.
It is also the starting point for the brunoise cut. The first reference to Julienne occurs in François Massialot's Le Cuisinier Royal in 1722.
Chiffonade; rolling leafy greens and slicing the roll in sections from 4-10mm in width

Cube cuts 
Cuts with six even sides include:
 Large dice; (or "Carré" meaning "square" in French); sides measuring approximately 
 Medium dice; (Parmentier); sides measuring approximately 
 Small dice; (Macédoine); sides measuring approximately 
 Brunoise; sides measuring approximately 
 Fine brunoise; sides measuring approximately

Other cuts 
Other cuts include:
 Paysanne; 
 Lozenge; diamond shape, 
 Fermière; cut lengthwise and then sliced to desired thickness 
 Rondelle; cylindrical vegetables cut to discs of desired thickness 
 Mirepoix; 
 Rough Cut; chopped more or less randomly resulting in a variety of sizes and shapes
 Mincing; very finely divided into uniform pieces
Wedges; round vegetables cut equally radially, used on tomato, potato, lemon, cut into four or six pieces or more

References 

Food preparation techniques
Cutting techniques (cooking)